Robert Stevens (c. 1924 – September 29, 2012) was an American basketball coach. He was the head men's basketball coach at the University of South Carolina and the University of Oklahoma. From 1959–60 to 1966–67, he posted a combined 80–124 win–loss record at the two schools.

Biography
Raised in Warsaw, Indiana, Stevens attended Sidney High School before going to college at the University of Michigan and Michigan State University; he played on the men's basketball team at Michigan State and graduated from the university in 1949. In World War II and the Korean War, Stevens served in the United States Marine Corps. He coached at Indiana's Milford High School before receiving his first collegiate job from Michigan State. Stevens spent three seasons coaching the university's freshman team, and was then promoted to an assistant position on the varsity team. After three seasons in that position, he was hired as head coach at South Carolina in 1959. The Gamecocks were 10–16 in 1959–60, Stevens' first head coaching season. Following 1960–61, a season in which the team had a 9–17 record, South Carolina improved to 15–12 in 1961–62, and Stevens earned the Atlantic Coast Conference Men's Basketball Coach of the Year award.

In April 1962, Stevens left South Carolina to become Oklahoma's men's basketball coach. In the five seasons that he coached the Sooners, the team did not post a winning record. Oklahoma's best record during this time came in Stevens' first season there, 1962–63, when the Sooners went 12–13. Reportedly "under pressure" after the 1966–67 season, Stevens resigned in April 1967. During his career, he was known for employing attacking, fast break offensive tactics. Later in his life, Stevens had a 20-year stint as leader of the Waterford Athletic Club, and was an assistant coach for the Continental Basketball Association's Oklahoma City Cavalry.

On September 29, 2012, Stevens died in a boating accident.

Head coaching record

References

1920s births
2012 deaths
Accidental deaths in Oklahoma
American men's basketball coaches
American men's basketball players
Basketball coaches from Indiana
Basketball players from Indiana
Boating accident deaths
Michigan State Spartans men's basketball players
Michigan Wolverines men's basketball players
Oklahoma Sooners men's basketball coaches
People from Warsaw, Indiana
South Carolina Gamecocks men's basketball coaches
United States Marine Corps personnel of the Korean War
United States Marine Corps personnel of World War II